The Samsung Galaxy Tab Pro 10.1 is a 10.1-inch Android-based tablet computer produced and marketed by Samsung Electronics. It belongs to the new generation of the Samsung Galaxy Tab series and Pro tablets, which also includes an 8.4-inch model, the Samsung Galaxy Tab Pro 8.4, a 12.2-inch Tab model, the Samsung Galaxy Tab Pro 12.2, and 12.2 inch Note model, the Samsung Galaxy Note Pro 12.2. It was announced on 6 January 2014. In the US it was released in February, starting at $499.

History 
The Galaxy Tab Pro 10.1 was announced on 6 January 2014. It was shown along with the Galaxy Note Pro 12.2, Tab Pro 12.2, and Tab Pro 8.4 at the 2014 Consumer Electronics Show in Las Vegas. It was released internationally on 6 March 2014.

Features
The Galaxy Tab Pro 10.1 is released with Android 4.4.2 KitKat. Samsung has customized the interface with its TouchWiz UX software. As well as the standard suite of Google apps, it has Samsung apps such as ChatON, S Suggest, S Voice, Smart Remote (Peel) and All Share Play. 

The Galaxy Tab Pro 10.1 is available in both Wi-Fi-only and 4G/LTE & Wi-Fi variants. Storage ranges from 16 GB to 32 GB depending on the model(the 32 GB has yet to be released and no date is available at this time), with a microSDXC card slot for expansion. It has a 10.1-inch WQXGA TFT screen with a resolution of 2560x1600 pixels and a pixel density of 299 ppi. It also features a 2 MP front camera and an 8 MP rear-facing camera. It also has the ability to record HD videos.

References

External links
 
 Manual de Usuario Oficial

Android (operating system) devices
Tablet computers introduced in 2014

Samsung Galaxy Tab series
Tablet computers